Carl Painter (born May 10, 1964) is a former American football running back. He played for the Detroit Lions from 1988 to 1989.

References

1964 births
Living people
Players of American football from Norfolk, Virginia
American football running backs
Hampton Pirates football players
Detroit Lions players
Orlando Thunder players